Tanakia is a genus of cyprinid fish, consisting of five species that occurs in Eastern Asia.  The type species is the Tanakia limbata.

Genus is named for Shigeho Tanaka (1878-1974), “accomplished” ichthyologist of the Imperial University of Tokyo, who described Tanakia shimazui in 1908 and Pseudorhodeus tanago in 1909.

Species
There are currently 9 species of this genus:
 Tanakia himantegus (Günther, 1868)
 Tanakia koreensis (I. S. Kim & C. H. Kim, 1990)
 Tanakia lanceolata (Temminck & Schlegel, 1846)
 Tanakia latimarginata (Kim, Jeon & Suk, 2014) 
 Tanakia limbata (Temminck & Schlegel, 1846) (Oily bitterling)
 Tanakia shimazui (S. Tanaka (I), 1908)
 Tanakia signifer (L. S. Berg, 1907)
 Tanakia somjinensis (I. S. Kim & C. H. Kim, 1991)
 Tanakia tanago (S. Tanaka, 1909) (Tokyo bitterling)

References

 
Taxa named by David Starr Jordan
Taxa named by William Francis Thompson
Fish of Asia